(born 1 April 1986 in Fukuchiyama) is a Japanese long-distance runner. Nakamura grew up in the Hyōgo Prefecture.

She finished seventh at the 2006 World Road Running Championships, helping the Japanese team win the bronze medal in the team competition. In 2008, she won the Nagoya Marathon in her marathon debut. In the 2008 Summer Olympics marathon, she finished 13th. She won the 2009 Sapporo Half Marathon title with a time of 1:09:20.

Achievements
All results regarding marathon, unless stated otherwise

Personal bests
3000 metres – 9:28.53 min (2002)
5000 metres – 15:13.01 min (2009)
10,000 metres – 31:14.39 min (2009)
Half marathon - 1:09:20 hrs (2009)
Marathon - 2:25:51 hrs (2008)

References

External links

marathoninfo

1986 births
Living people
People from Kyoto Prefecture
Japanese female marathon runners
Japanese female long-distance runners
Olympic athletes of Japan
Olympic female marathon runners
Athletes (track and field) at the 2008 Summer Olympics
World Athletics Championships athletes for Japan
Japan Championships in Athletics winners
20th-century Japanese women
21st-century Japanese women